Amerila lactea is a moth of the subfamily Arctiinae. It was described by Walter Rothschild in 1910. It is found in Myanmar and Nepal.

References

 , 2010: Tiger-moths of Eurasia (Lepidoptera, Arctiidae) (Nyctemerini by ). Neue Entomologische Nachrichten 65: 1-106, Marktleuthen.
 , 1910: Catalogue of the Arctianae in the Tring museum, with notes and descriptions of new species. Novitates Zoologicae 17 (1): 1-85, (2): 113-188, pl. XI-XIV, 18: pl. III-VI, London and Aylesbury.

Moths described in 1910
Amerilini
Moths of Asia